The Chinese kukri snake (Oligodon chinensis) is a species of snake of the family Colubridae.

Geographic range
The snake is found in China and Vietnam.

References 

Reptiles described in 1888
Taxa named by Albert Günther
Reptiles of China
Reptiles of Vietnam
Colubrids
chinensis
Snakes of Asia
Snakes of China
Snakes of Vietnam